Maurice Lesemann (28 November 1899 – 2 October 1981) was a United States poet.

Lesemann was born in Chicago, the son of a Methodist clergyman.  He studied at the University of Chicago where he served as president of the Poetry Club, several of whose members — including Lesemann — were published in early numbers of the magazine Poetry. Before graduating with a Bachelor of Arts, he travelled to New Mexico to visit Yvor Winters and Glenway Wescott, and spent some time in teaching in the town of Cerrillos. After graduating he went into advertising. He married in 1926.

Prizes
 1920: Poetry Chicago's Young Poet's Prize
 Witter Bynner Poetry Prize 
 1927: Levinson Prize

1899 births
1981 deaths
American male poets
20th-century American poets
20th-century American male writers
University of Chicago alumni